Oleg Prihodko (born 3 October 1997) is a Ukrainian tennis player.

Prihodko has a career high ATP singles ranking of World No. 349 achieved on 18 July 2022 and a career high ATP doubles ranking of World No. 155 achieved on 29 August 2022.

As a junior he won the Ukrzakhid ITF tournament in 2013 and 2014 as well as the Vila Do Conde Junior Tennis Cup in 2013. In junior doubles he won the Donetsk City Cup with his doubles partner Vladyslav Lobak.

Future/ITF World Tennis Tour and Challenger finals

Singles: 6 (2–4)

Doubles: 41 (20–21)

References

External links
 
 
 

1997 births
Living people
People from Pavlohrad
Ukrainian male tennis players
Sportspeople from Dnipropetrovsk Oblast